The S.H. Prior Memorial Prize was an Australian literary award for a work of fiction. It was established in 1934 by H. K. Prior in recognition of his late father, Samuel Henry Prior, who was editor of The Bulletin. It was open to Australian residents or persons born in Australia, New Zealand or the South Pacific islands.

Award winners:
 1935: Kylie Tennant – Tiburon
 1936: Miles Franklin – All That Swagger
1937-1938: Not awarded
1939: Miles Franklin and Kate Baker – Who Was Joseph Furphy?
1940: Eve Langley – The Pea Pickers; M. H. Ellis – Lachlan Macquarie; Kylie Tennant – The Battlers
1941: Not awarded
1942: Gavin S. Casey – It's Harder for Girls
1943-1944: Not awarded
1945: Douglas Stewart – The Fire on the Snow
1946: Brian James – Cookabundy Bridge

References

Australian literary awards
1934 establishments in Australia